Carpophyllum maschalocarpum, commonly known as the common flapjack, is a brown alga that grows in crevices of rocks at low tide levels. It is a common alga in New Zealand and is endemic.

Description 
Carpophyllum maschalocarpum is mid-golden brown in colour and dries black.

Distribution 
This species can be found on the shores of the North Island, South Island, and the Chatham Islands.

Habitat 
Carpophyllum maschalocarpum is found on rocks at low water in pools and channels forming a distinct zone and especially on vertical rock faces on open coasts.

References

Fucales
Flora of New Zealand